The 2021–22 season is the 74th season in the history of Alanyaspor and the sixth consecutive season in the top tier of Turkish football, the Süper Lig. In addition to the domestic league, Alanyaspor are participating in this season's edition of the Turkish Cup.

Players

First-team suad

Out on loan

Competitions

Overall record

Süper Lig

League table

Results summary

Results by round

Matches

Turkish Cup

References

Alanyaspor